Eastern Highway is a 1.2 kilometre highway in inner northern Melbourne, Australia, that ultimately acts as a feeder road into the Eastern Freeway. This name however is not widely known to most drivers, as the allocation is still best known by the name of its sole constituent part: Alexandra Parade.

Route
Alexandra Parade begins at the intersection with Nicholson Street and Princes Streets in Fitzroy along a wide dual-carriageway alignment, varying between eight and ten lanes, heading east across Brunswick Street, before terminating shortly after at Gold Street in Collingwood: the skewed alignment into the Eastern Freeway continues east beyond, along with ramps for access to/from Hoddle Street 350m further east.

History
The passing of the Highways and Vehicles Act of 1924 through the Parliament of Victoria provided for the declaration of State Highways, roads two-thirds financed by the State government through the Country Roads Board (later VicRoads). The Eastern Highway was declared a State Highway in October 1977, along Alexandra Parade from Nicholson Street in Fitzroy to Gold Street in Collingwood, but was still referenced on local signage as Alexandra Parade.

Alexandra Parade previously extended a short distance east beyond Hoddle Street, under the Whittlesea railway line to end at Dights Falls on the Yarra River: with the opening of the first stage of the Eastern Freeway in December 1977, Alexandra Parade was truncated back to Gold Street. A vestigial alignment partially survives as Alexandra Parade East, running parallel to the eastbound entry ramp.

Alexandra Parade was signed as Metropolitan Route 83 between Fitzroy and Collingwood in 1989; it previously continued east along Eastern Freeway until it was replaced by route M3 when EastLink opened in 2008. Metropolitan Route 46 runs concurrent along Alexandra Parade, between Nicholson Street and Queens Parade through Fitzroy North, signed from 1965.

The passing of the Road Management Act 2004 granted the responsibility of overall management and development of Victoria's major arterial roads to VicRoads: in 2004, VicRoads re-declared Eastern Highway (Arterial #6830) between Nicholson and Gold Streets. The road is still presently known (and signposted) as Alexandra Parade along its entire length.

Major intersections

See also

 List of Melbourne highways

References
 

Highways and freeways in Melbourne
Transport in the City of Yarra
Fitzroy, Victoria